This is a list of honorary degree recipients from the University of Calcutta.

Honorary degree recipients

 Color key
 Light green indicates "(Special)";  pink indicates "(Posthumous)"

See also 

 University of Calcutta
 List of Calcutta University people

References

External links
Recipients of Hony. Degrees
Official website

Calcutta
Kolkata-related lists
Lists of Indian people